Walter Carter may refer to:

 Walter C. Carter (1929–2002), Canadian politician
 Walter P. Carter (1923–1971), civil rights activist in Baltimore
 Walter E. Carter Jr., Vice Admiral and Naval Flight Officer, formerly president of the U.S. Naval War College and current Superintendent, United States Naval Academy